The Beast is an Italian comedy directed by Sergio Corbucci and stars Gabriella Giorgelli, Michel Constantin and Giancarlo Giannini.

Plot
An older and younger truck drivers, Sandro and Nino, begin to work with each others. They alternate in driving their company's vehicle across central and Eastern Europe. After witnessing the harsh treatment of an older colleague, forced to retire on medical grounds and led to suicide by his illness and indigence after a life of hard work, Nino convinces Sandro to take up loans and start their own delivery company. They struggle however to honor their debt, due to market fluctuations. This forces them to accept smuggling a criminal, originally misrepresented just as a parcel. Abandoning him just beyond the border, the two drivers are pursued by his criminal accomplishes while trying hard to keep their schedule with their customer.

The professional relationship gradually develops into mutual respect and shared background among the two men, with Sandro eventually beginning to date Nino's daughter. Eventually their first trip as independent delivery company is successful, although just barely so. By the end of the movie, three co-protagonists are made very familiar to the audience: the two men, as well as their truck ("il bestione" i.e. "The Beast"), personification of blue-collar work.

Cast
 Giancarlo Giannini as Nino Patrovita
 Michel Constantin as Sandro Colautti
 Giuseppe Maffioli as Super Shell
 Giuliana Calandra as Amalia
 Dalila Di Lazzaro as Magda
 Enzo Fiermonte as Matteo Zaghi
 Jole Fierro as the former wife of Colautti		
 Philippe Hersent as Owner of CISA Car Company
 Carlo Gaddi as Camorrista
 Gabriella Giorgelli as Zoe
 Attilio Duse as Truck driver
 Anna Mazzamauro as Friend of Amalia
 Giorgio Trestini as Andrea
 Imma Piro as Lella Colautti
 Franco Angrisano as Mafioso
 Romano Puppo as Dutch Driver
 Franca Scagnetti as Receptionist
 Sergio Testori as Dutchman

Release
The film premiered on 20 November 1974 in Paris and screened in West Germany on 14 February 1975 as Die Cleveren Zwei with an Warner-Columbia Filmverleih distribution.

References

External links 
 

1974 films
1970s buddy comedy films
1970s thriller drama films
Commedia all'italiana
Films scored by Guido & Maurizio De Angelis
Films directed by Sergio Corbucci
1970s Italian-language films
Italian buddy comedy films
Italian comedy-drama films
Italian thriller drama films
French comedy-drama films
French thriller drama films
Trucker films
French buddy films
1974 comedy films
1974 drama films
Films with screenplays by Sergio Donati
Films with screenplays by Luciano Vincenzoni
1970s Italian films
1970s French films